Achslach is a municipality in the district of Regen in Bavaria in Germany.

Population development

 1840: 956 
 1900: 955 
 1939: 965 
 1950: 1180 
 1970: 1024 
 1991: 1241 
 2005: 1080 
 2015: 902

References

Regen (district)